Pembroke Dock Market is the name of an electoral ward in the town of Pembroke Dock, Pembrokeshire, Wales.

Description
Pembroke Dock Market ward covers the central area of the town between Bush Street and Milton Terrace, as well as Llanreath and Pembroke Dockyard. Pembroke Dock Pennar ward lies to the south and Pembroke Dock Central lies to the north.

The ward elects a county councillor to Pembrokeshire County Council and three town councillors to Pembroke Dock Town Council.

According to the 2011 UK Census the population of the ward was 1,897.

Town Council elections
Town councillor and Pembroke Dock mayor Jane McNaughton resigned in November 2017 over the issue of dealing with alleged bullying of staff. A by-election took place on 22 March 2018 and local postmaster Terry Judkins won the seat with 147 votes on a 17.9% turnout.

County Council elections
At the May 2017 county election the sitting Independent county councillor, Brian Hall, successfully defended his seat.

* = sitting councillor prior to the election

See also
 List of electoral wards in Pembrokeshire

References

Pembrokeshire electoral wards
Pembroke Dock